The men's 1500 metre freestyle event for the 1976 Summer Olympics was held in Montreal. The event took place on 19 and 20 July.

Records
At the start of this event, the existing World and Olympic records were as follows.

The following records were established during the competition:

Results

Heats
Heat 1

Heat 2

Heat 3

Heat 4

Heat 5

Final

References

External links
Official Olympic Report

Swimming at the 1976 Summer Olympics
Men's events at the 1976 Summer Olympics